RCDS may refer to 

Royal College of Defence Studies
Rye Country Day School